The following is a table with laboratories organized by year of creation.

18th century

19th century

20th century

21st century

See also 
 Pharmacy
 List of drugs
 List of drugs by year of discovery
 History of medicine

References

History of pharmacy
Lab